This is a list of sovereign states and dependent territories in Eurasia, along with other areas of special political status.

Eurasia is a continent comprising the traditional continents of Europe and Asia. It is divided from Africa by the Isthmus of Suez. Some states such as Malta are traditionally part of Eurasia, however they lie on the African tectonic plate. It is separated from Australasia (Oceania) somewhere in the Malay archipelago, and is usually considered as including Indonesia and Timor-Leste (East Timor).

Some areas are associated with Eurasian states, being part of them or dependent upon them, but are not physically in it. Examples are the Danish territory of Greenland, the French overseas areas, the Spanish cities of Ceuta and Melilla, and most of the British overseas territories.

Sovereign states

United Nations Member States
The following is a list of internationally recognised sovereign states that are members of the United Nations.

United Nations Observer States
Non-member sovereign states are free to submit a petition to join as a full member at their discretion. The petition is then evaluated by the United Nations Security Council and the General Assembly. For example, Switzerland was a permanent observer state from 1948 to 2002, until becoming a full member on September 10, 2002. Currently, there are two observer non-member states: the Holy See and Palestine. They are both permanent observers, described as "Non-member States having received a standing invitation to participate as observers in the sessions and the work of the General Assembly and maintaining permanent observer missions at Headquarters".

States with limited recognition
The following entities are not UN member states and have limited or no recognition. However, they are defined as states by the declarative theory of statehood.

Dependent territories
The following entities are territories in Eurasia that remain outside the controlling state's integral area.

Special areas of internal sovereignty
The following entities are an integral part of their controlling state but have a political arrangement which was decided by an agreement with another state.

See also

 List of Eurasian countries by population
 List of Asian countries and territories
 List of European countries and territories
 List of sovereign states and dependent territories in Africa
 List of sovereign states and dependent territories in Oceania

Notes

References

Lists of countries by continent
Lists of countries in Asia
Lists of countries in Europe